Brook Hall is a historic home located at Glade Spring, Washington County, Virginia. It was built about 1830, and is a large two-story, five bay, "T" plan, Federal style brick dwelling.  The house has a four-bay, two-story brick wing. The interior retains spectacular carved woodwork as well as very early, possibly original, paint on woodgrained doors and marbled mantels and baseboards.  Also on the property is a contributing spring house.

It was listed on the National Register of Historic Places in 1997.

References

Houses on the National Register of Historic Places in Virginia
Federal architecture in Virginia
Houses completed in 1830
Houses in Washington County, Virginia
National Register of Historic Places in Washington County, Virginia
1830 establishments in Virginia